Theasinensin A is polyphenol flavonoid from black tea (Camellia sinensis) created during fermentation, by oxidation of epigallocatechin gallate.

Its atropisomer is theasinensin D.

See also
Theasinensin B
Theasinensin C
Theasinensin D
Theasinensin E
Theasinensin F
Theasinensin G

References 
 
 
 

Flavanols
Polyphenols
Biphenyls